The Beit Castel gallery (House Of Castel), בית קסטל, is a gallery in the Artists' Colony of Safed. It is unique in its adherence to hosting art of a diverse range of artists from the Artists' Quarter of Safed with a special focus on the golden age of art in Safed.

History 
Beit Castel used to be the home of the renowned Israeli artist: Moshe Castel. The house that over time decayed was sold by Moshe Castel to his friend Yakov Hadad. Yakov Hadad as a boy was the court boy of Israeli giants such as Yitzhak Frenkel Frenel and Moshe Castel and used to assist others such as Nahum Gutman in order to make a bit of money for his family. Yakov Hadad has since rebuilt the gallery, turning the house itself into a fascinating work of art.

In fact, the house (now gallery) itself is located in incredible proximity to the houses of artists such as Shimshon Holzman and Yitzhak Frenkel Frenel in Yitzhak Frenkel Frenel/Moshe Castel streets (Tet'Vav/Tet'Zain street).

Art 
The art in the gallery was overwhelmingly produced by the great artists of the quarter such as Yitzhak Frenkel Frenel, Shimshon Holzman, Rolly Schaffer, Moshe Castel, Aaron Yaackobson and others. The art in the gallery is a fine mixture of modern art from the early 20th century up into the modern day, representing the breadth of modern Jewish art in pre-state Israel and the modern state of Israel.

Ambience 
The gallery has a unique middle-eastern ambience thanks to its beautiful ornate gardens, trees and little courtyards. It contains a wide variety of ancient tools and stone works collected in part by Moshe Castel, Yakov Hadad and other Israeli artists who found those stoneworks among rubble, in the fields or in other locations.

See also 
 Yitzhak Frenkel Frenel
 Moshe Castel
 Shimshon Holzman
 Safed

References 

Art museums and galleries in Israel
Safed